Cristián Limenza Estigarribia (born 17 November 1976) was a Paraguayan–born Chilean football goalkeeper.

His last club was —then Primera B de Chile side— Deportes Puerto Montt (2016–2018).

Club career
Born in Asunción, Paraguay, Limenza aged 20 joined third-tier team Presidente Hayes in 2003, where he played two seasons.

In 2005, he moved to Chile's Primera B (second level) side Lota Schwager thanks the management of his friend Félix González, who invite him to play with the club. One year later he was a key player in the club's promotion to Primera División, after saving two shoots in the penalties against Rangers at the promotion playoffs final.

In January 2007 he signed for Primera División club Unión Española. He remained at Unión until 2009, and the incoming season he moved to Deportes Iquique where helped the team to win the Primera B and Copa Chile Bicentenario titles.

After being released from Iquique in 2012, he joined Santiago Morning the next year, playing with the club the transition season and the 2013–14 season.

In June 2014 he joined Deportes Concepción.

In mid-2016, after the controversial elimination of Concepción from the professional football by the ANFP, he joined Deportes Puerto Montt.

Honours

Club
Deportes Iquique
 Primera B: 2010
 Copa Chile: 2010

References

External links
 
 

1976 births
Living people
Paraguayan footballers
Paraguayan expatriate footballers
Paraguay international footballers
Lota Schwager footballers
Unión Española footballers
Deportes Iquique footballers
Chilean Primera División players
Primera B de Chile players
Expatriate footballers in Chile
Sportspeople from Asunción
Association football goalkeepers
Naturalized citizens of Chile